Alexander Marcus Hooks (August 29, 1906 – June 19, 1993) was an American professional baseball player. He had a 17-season (1928–1943; 1946) career in minor league baseball, and appeared in 15 Major League games as a first baseman and pinch hitter for the Philadelphia Athletics during the  season. Hooks attended Southern Methodist University.

Hooks' Major League trial occurred at the outset of the 1935 season when he was 28 years old.  The previous year, he had batted a robust .340 for the Tulsa Oilers of the Texas League.  In his big-league debut, Hooks went 2-for-5 against the Washington Senators, but then went hitless in seven at bats in his next two starts, and failed to hold the Athletics' starting first baseman job.  After his last MLB appearance on May 20, he was sent to the Atlanta Crackers of the Southern Association, where he batted .341.

Hooks also briefly managed in the minors, with the 1938 Montreal Royals and the 1946 Greenville Majors.

His ten Major-League hits included three doubles.

References

External links

1906 births
1993 deaths
Atlanta Crackers players
Baseball players from Texas
Chattanooga Lookouts players
Decatur Commodores players
Fort Worth Cats players
Greenville Majors players
Hazleton Mountaineers players
Indianapolis Indians players
Knoxville Smokies players
Major League Baseball first basemen
Minneapolis Millers (baseball) players
Montreal Royals managers
Montreal Royals players
New Orleans Pelicans (baseball) players
Oklahoma City Indians players
People from Edgewood, Texas
Philadelphia Athletics players
SMU Mustangs baseball coaches
Terre Haute Tots players
Tulsa Oilers (baseball) players
Wichita Aviators players